Dabanas was a fortress in Osroene, inhabited during Roman and Byzantine times. It is mentioned by Procopius and was used by the emperor Justinian I.

Its site is located near Dibni in Asiatic Turkey.

References

Populated places in Osroene
Former populated places in Turkey
Roman towns and cities in Turkey
History of Diyarbakır Province
Populated places of the Byzantine Empire